Ignaz von Peczely (January 26, 1826 – July 14, 1911) was a Hungarian scientist, physician, homeopath, considered the father of modern iridology. Von Peczely first thought of iridology when caring for an owl with a broken leg. After noticing a spot in the owl's eye he hypothesized a link between the two and later tested this theory with other animals and people. While iridology has been largely dismissed as pseudoscience, his research led to the first known accurate drawing of an iris.

Works 
 A szivárványhártyáról. (Iris). Bpest, 1873. Táblarajzzal.
 Entdeckungen auf dem Gebiete der Natur- und der Heilkunde. Die chronischen Krankheiten. 1. Heft: Anleitung zum Studium der Diagnose aus den Augen. Budapest, 1880
 Utasitás a bujakór gyökeres gyógyítására és gyógyszereim mikénti használatára. U. ott, 1883.
 Die Lungenschwindsucht und behufs Bewahrung vor derselben. Instruction zur gründlichen Heilung der acuten und chronischen Lungencatarrhe. Budapest: E. Bartalits, 1884
 A fertőzés szomorú következményeinek kikerülhetése tekintetéből felvilágositás: az ivarszervek élettani állapotáról. U. ott, 1885.
 Die Augendiagnose des Dr. Ignacz von Péczely nach eigenen Beobachtungen von Emil Schlegel. Tübingen, 1887. Hat fametszettel s egy színes táblarajzzal.
 Om ögondiagnosen och en rationel sjukdomsbehandling efter Dr. Ignacz Péczely, af N. Liljequist. Stockholm, 1893.

See also
 Iridology
 Nils Liljequist

References

Bibliography 
 
 
 
 

1826 births
1911 deaths
19th-century Hungarian physicians